The 1977 European Weightlifting Championships were held in Stuttgart, West Germany from September 17 to September 25, 1977. This was the 56th edition of the event. There were 128 men in action from 24 nations. This tournament was a part of  1977 World Weightlifting Championships.

Medal summary

Medal table
Ranking by Big (Total result) medals

References
Results (Chidlovski.net)
М. Л. Аптекарь. «Тяжёлая атлетика. Справочник.» — М.: «Физкультура и спорт», 1983. — 416 с. 

European Weightlifting Championships
European Weightlifting Championships
European Weightlifting Championships
European Weightlifting Championships
International weightlifting competitions hosted by Germany
Sports competitions in Stuttgart
20th century in Stuttgart